Irina Kormysheva (born 22 July 1976) is a Kazakhstani freestyle skier. She competed in the women's moguls event at the 1998 Winter Olympics.

References

1976 births
Living people
Kazakhstani female freestyle skiers
Olympic freestyle skiers of Kazakhstan
Freestyle skiers at the 1998 Winter Olympics
Place of birth missing (living people)
Asian Games medalists in freestyle skiing
Freestyle skiers at the 2003 Asian Winter Games
Asian Games silver medalists for Kazakhstan
Medalists at the 2003 Asian Winter Games
21st-century Kazakhstani women